Moacyr Dunham (born 15 October 1910, date of death unknown) was a Brazilian épée, foil and sabre fencer. He competed in five events at the 1936 Summer Olympics.

References

External links
 

1910 births
Year of death missing
Brazilian male épée fencers
Olympic fencers of Brazil
Fencers at the 1936 Summer Olympics
Brazilian male foil fencers
Brazilian male sabre fencers
20th-century Brazilian people